KLGA may refer to:

 The ICAO code for LaGuardia Airport in New York City
 KLGA-FM, a radio station (92.7 FM) licensed to serve Algona, Iowa, United States
 KLGZ, a radio station (1600 AM) licensed to serve Algona, Iowa.